This is a comprehensive list of songs by English band Blur. Since forming in 1989, the band have released eight studio albums, three live albums, seven compilation albums, and thirty-five singles. This list does not contain live versions or remixes released by the band.

Blur have officially released 255 songs, excluding alternate versions or remixes.

Original songs

Covers

Alternate/remix
This list does not include live versions.

Other recordings
There are also seven hidden tracks on the 13 album. These are all untitled and are found after "Bugman", "Coffee & TV", "B.L.U.R.E.M.I.", "Battle", "Trailerpark", with the remaining two at the end of "Caramel".
On Starshaped, "Commercial Break" is given a new name, "Outro".
Also on Starshaped are some songs only on that release. "Explain" is one of these, given a different name ("Can't Explain"), and "When Will We Be Married" is another).
No Distance Left to Run features "Intro", the track that opens the Hyde Park concert featured on the second DVD.
Some US promo CDs include 'callout research hooks', ten second clips intended for radio stations.

Interview tracks feature on the interview albums Focusing in with Blur, Basically Blur, Blurb, 15on13 and Interview CD.

Blur

Blur